Seodaejeon Negeori Station is a station of Daejeon Metro Line 1 in Yongdu-dong, Jung District, Daejeon, South Korea.

Elevator incident

This subway station was the site of a man in a wheelchair who rammed the doors of an elevator multiple times, and eventually fell to his death after he disabled both doors. He was awarded a Darwin Award and elevators in South Korean subway stations later started to install stickers telling not to do that action.

References

External links

 

Daejeon Metro stations
Jung District, Daejeon
Railway stations opened in 2006